Murarrie railway station is located on the Cleveland line in Queensland, Australia. It serves the Brisbane suburb of Murarrie. It opened in 1888 as Mooraree and the name of both the station and the locality were changed to Murarrie in 1907. On 15 July 1996, the Fisherman Islands line to the Port of Brisbane opened to the north of the station. To the east of the station a disused spur to Gibson Island branches off.

Services
Murarrie is served by Cleveland line services from Shorncliffe, Northgate, Doomben and Bowen Hills to Manly and Cleveland.

Services by platform

References

External links

Murarrie station Queensland's Railways on the Internet
[ Murarrie station] TransLink travel information

Railway stations in Brisbane